Dunbar School may refer to:

 Dunbar School (Phoenix, Arizona)
 Dunbar School (Tucson, Arizona)
 Dunbar Magnet Middle School, in Little Rock, Arkansas
 Dunbar School (Ardmore, Oklahoma), listed on the National Register of Historic Places (NRHP) in Carter County, Oklahoma
Dunbar School (Elsemere, Kentucky) (later Wilkins Heights School)
 Dunbar Public School, in Loudon, Tennessee, listed on the NRHP in Loudon County, Tennessee
 Paul Laurence Dunbar High School (Fort Worth, Texas)
 Dunbar School (Fairmont, West Virginia)
Dunbar High School (Washington, D.C.)

See also
 Paul Lawrence Dunbar School (disambiguation)
 Dunbar High School (disambiguation)